Austria competed at the 2012 Summer Paralympics in London, United Kingdom from August 29 to September 9, 2012.

Medalists

| width="78%" align="left" valign="top" |

| width="22%" align="left" valign="top" |

Athletics
Men

Track

Field

Women
Field

Cycling

Road

Track

Pursuit

Time Trial

Equestrian

Sailing

Shooting

Swimming

Men

Women

Wheelchair fencing

Wheelchair tennis
Men

Women

Table Tennis
Men

Women

References 

Nations at the 2012 Summer Paralympics
2012